Tetsugyu Soin Ban ( Hanamaki, Japan, 4 June 1910 – Tokyo, Japan, 21 January 1996) was a Japanese Zen master.
He was a disciple of the Soto Zen Master Harada Daiun Sogaku, one of the first Zen teachers to open his doctrine to western students.

Biography 
Tetsugyu Soin Ban was ordained as a Soto Zen monk in 1917, Fuchizawa, by Zen master Engaku Chimyo.

From 1931 to 1938 Ban trained at Hosshin-ji Monastery under Harada Daiun Sogaku, inheriting the Zen style of teaching that combines the Rinzai Zen use of koans with Soto Zen forms. Subsequently, Ban studied at Komazawa University, where he graduated in 1941.

In 1947 Ban Tetsugyu Soin became Tanto, or Head of Practice, of Hosshin-ji Monastery. One year later, he held the same position at Hoon-ji, a Rinzai temple in Kyoto. Ban received Dharma transmission from Harada Daiun Sogaku and founded the Soto Zen temple Tosho-ji, in Tokyo. In the following years, Ban also founded the Soto Zen temples Kannon-ji, in Iwate Prefecture and Tetsugyu-ji, in Oita Prefecture.

Tetsugyu Soin was one of the first Zen masters to open the doors of the Japanese Zen monastery to European and American disciples. One well-known disciple was Maura Soshin O'Halloran, an Irish Buddhist nun who wrote about her Zen training at Kannon-ji and Tosho-ji in her diary Pure Heart, Enlightened Mind, in which she refers to Ban Roshi with the honorific title "Go-Roshi." Another disciple is the American Zen teacher Paul Tesshin Silverman, who, succeeded Tetsugyu Soin as the abbot of Tetsugyu-ji in 1993, becoming the first western abbot of a Japanese monastery.

Tetsugyu Soin died on January 21, 1996, after a life dedicated to spreading Zen in Japan and beyond.

Bibliography

Sources

References

External links 
 Tetsugyuji International Zen Center
 Kannon-ji

1910 births
1996 deaths
Japanese Zen Buddhists
Japanese Buddhist clergy
People from Hanamaki, Iwate
People from Iwate Prefecture
20th-century Buddhist monks